Marko Bakić (born 1 November 1993) is a Montenegrin professional footballer who plays as a midfielder for Greek Super League club OFI.

Club career

Torino
On 30 August 2012, it was announced that Bakić signed a two-year contract with Torino F.C., with a clause that states that Fiorentina possesses 50% of the player's contract and is eligible to have the player introduced to their squad after a season spent with Torino. Bakić made his Serie A debut at the age of 19 for Torino on 19 May 2013, in a 2–2 draw with Calcio Catania.

Fiorentina
On 21 June 2013, Bakić was transferred from Torino to Fiorentina.

Braga
On 27 July 2016, Bakić signed a five-year contract for Portuguese club Braga. After being sparingly used, he was loaned to Spanish Segunda División club AD Alcorcón on 31 January 2017.

Mouscron
After having spent the 2018/19 season at Mouscron on loan from Braga with an option to buy, Mouscron decided to activate the option in June 2019. Bakić penned a 4-year contract.

International career
Bakić made his debut for Montenegro at the age of 18 against Latvia on 15 August 2012 and has, as of July 2020, earned a total of 15 caps, scoring no goals.

Career statistics

Club

Honours
Mogren
Montenegrin First League: 2010–11

References

External links

 
 Profile at fscg.co.me
 

1993 births
Living people
People from Budva
Association football forwards
Montenegrin footballers
Montenegro youth international footballers
Montenegro under-21 international footballers
Montenegro international footballers
FK Mogren players
Torino F.C. players
ACF Fiorentina players
Spezia Calcio players
C.F. Os Belenenses players
S.C. Braga players
AD Alcorcón footballers
Royal Excel Mouscron players
Montenegrin First League players
Serie A players
Serie B players
Primeira Liga players
Segunda División players
Belgian Pro League players
Montenegrin expatriate footballers
Expatriate footballers in Italy
Montenegrin expatriate sportspeople in Italy
Expatriate footballers in Portugal
Montenegrin expatriate sportspeople in Portugal
Expatriate footballers in Spain
Montenegrin expatriate sportspeople in Spain
Expatriate footballers in Belgium
Montenegrin expatriate sportspeople in Belgium